Zaynab M. Mohamed (born May 4, 1997) is an American politician serving as a member of the Minnesota State Senate since 2023. A member of the Minnesota Democratic–Farmer–Labor Party (DFL), she represents District 63, comprising southeast Minneapolis and parts of Richfield.

Early life and education 
Mohamed immigrated with her family at age nine from Somalia to Minneapolis's Powderhorn neighborhood, where she grew up. In 2019, she graduated from the University of Minnesota with a degree in human resources.

Career

Pre-campaign political activity 
Mohamed interned for Ayada Leads, a nonprofit that seeks to support Black immigrant women in political participation. While working as a community advocacy manager for the Council on American-Islamic Relations in Minnesota, she advocated for legislation relating to public safety reform, including no-knock warrants. In January 2022, she began working as a policy aide to Jason Chavez, a Minneapolis City Council member.

Minnesota State Senate 

Patricia Torres Ray, the incumbent senator for District 63, did not run for reelection in 2022. After conversations with Torres Ray and other organizers, Mohamed entered the race, and was endorsed by Torres Ray. The main themes of her campaign were a statewide $15 minimum wage, universal health care, and public safety.

After defeating Todd Scott in the primary election to become the DFL nominee, Mohamed won the general election against Republican nominee Shawn Holster.

Mohamed joined Erin Maye Quade and Clare Oumou Verbeten as the first Black women elected to the Minnesota Senate. She is also the youngest woman ever elected to serve in the legislature.

References

External links

Women state legislators in Minnesota
Politicians from Minneapolis
Living people
Minnesota Democrats
1997 births
American Muslims
Somalian emigrants to the United States
American politicians of Somalian descent
21st-century American politicians
University of Minnesota alumni
21st-century American women politicians